Haciendo escante is the second EP by American singer Nicky Jam.

Track listing

References

Nicky Jam albums
2001 debut albums
Pina Records albums